Naser al-Sohi (born 24 August 1974 – 28 July 2004) is a retired Kuwait international footballer who played as a midfielder.

Career
Al-Sohi was the first Arab footballer to play in the Ukrainian Premier League. FC Dynamo Kyiv had sent a scout to the 1995 FIFA World Youth Championship finals in Qatar, and after the scout made a stop in Kuwait, the club took al-Sohi on trial. During his trial, al-Sohi made one Premier League appearance entering as a substitute against MFC Mykolaiv in June 1995. His Kuwaiti club offered to loan the player to Dynamo on a six-month loan for $500,000, but Dynamo ultimately declined.

Al-Sohi made several appearances for the Kuwait national football team, including a 2002 FIFA World Cup qualifier against Bahrain on 3 February 2001. He also played for Kuwait at the 2000 AFC Asian Cup finals in Lebanon.

References

External links

1974 births
Living people
Kuwaiti footballers
Kuwait international footballers
Kuwaiti expatriate footballers
2000 AFC Asian Cup players
Association football midfielders
Asian Games bronze medalists for Kuwait
Asian Games medalists in football
Footballers at the 1994 Asian Games
Medalists at the 1994 Asian Games
Expatriate footballers in Bahrain
Kuwaiti expatriate sportspeople in Bahrain
Kuwait Premier League players
Kuwaiti expatriate sportspeople in Qatar
Al-Arabi SC (Qatar) players
Expatriate footballers in Qatar
Al Tadhamon SC players
Al-Najma SC (Bahrain) players
FC Dynamo Kyiv players
FC Dynamo-2 Kyiv players
Qatar Stars League players
Bahraini Premier League players
Ukrainian Premier League players
Ukrainian First League players